Douglas Freitas Cardozo Rodrigues (born 16 March 1982), known as Douglas Rodrigues or just Douglas, is a Brazilian footballer who plays as a striker.

Club career
He joined FC Chiasso in February 2006 before signing for Widzew Lodz in Poland in June 2007. In December 2008, he moved back to Brazil to play for Guaratinguetá, signing a deal until June 2010.

Honours
Santos
Campeonato Brasileiro Série A: 2002

Buriram
Thai Division 1 League: 2011

External links

1982 births
Living people
Brazilian footballers
Brazilian expatriate footballers
Association football forwards
Elche CF players
Expatriate footballers in Switzerland
Expatriate footballers in Poland
Expatriate footballers in Spain
Expatriate footballers in Italy
Footballers from São Paulo (state)
S.S.D. Varese Calcio players
Brazilian expatriate sportspeople in Spain
Brazilian expatriate sportspeople in Switzerland
Brazilian expatriate sportspeople in Poland
Expatriate footballers in Thailand
Brazilian expatriate sportspeople in Thailand
Santos FC players
Goiás Esporte Clube players
FC Chiasso players
Widzew Łódź players
Guaratinguetá Futebol players
Clube Atlético Sorocaba players
Uberaba Sport Club players
Douglas Rodrigues
Douglas Rodrigues
Douglas Rodrigues